Lacu Sărat may refer to:

 , a village in the commune Pomezeu, Bihor County, Romania
 , a village in the commune Chiscani, Brăila County, Romania